Vilapicina is a station on line 5 of the Barcelona Metro.

The station is located underneath Passeig Fabra i Puig, between Carrer Teide and Carrer Petrarca. It was opened in 1959, and served as a terminus until the opening of Horta in 1967.

The station has a ticket hall on either end, one with two accesses, the other with one. The station has two platforms and three tracks, the outermost one leading to the nearby train depot.

Services

External links

 Vilapicina at Trenscat.com

Railway stations in Spain opened in 1959
Barcelona Metro line 5 stations
Transport in Horta-Guinardó